Kevin Seymour (December 25, 1958 – February 6, 2014) was an American ADR director/writer and voice actor, known for his work on numerous English-language anime dubs. Seymour was the founder of U.S. Renditions and Animaze, and worked on the English versions of titles such as Ninja Scroll, the Ghost in the Shell franchise, Macross Plus, Perfect Blue, Armitage III, Metropolis, and Code Geass - Lelouch of the Rebellion, as well as redubs of Akira and The Castle of Cagliostro.

References

External links 

1958 births
2014 deaths
American male voice actors
American male screenwriters
American television writers
Place of death missing
Place of birth missing
American casting directors
American voice directors
American male television writers